Taikoo Li or Taigu Li  may refer to:

Taikoo Li Sanlitun, Beijing
Sino-Ocean Taikoo Li Chengdu

See also
Tai Koo (disambiguation)
Taikoo Hui (disambiguation)
Swire Properties